Trevor Challis (born 23 October 1975) is an English former professional footballer.

He was part of the successful Queens Park Rangers youth team that won the South East Counties League and Southern Junior Floodlit Cup final beating West Ham.

Trevor played in the Premier League for Queens Park Rangers during the 1995–1996 season playing left back earning a call up for England under 21s in the Toulon tournament, making 2 appearances against Angola and Portugal. Trevor represented England at under 16,18,21 levels as well as Ireland at under 16 level. During the 1996–1997 season Trevor received a bad knee injury in a heavy challenge with Norwich city footballer Rob Newman. It took Trevor 20 months and 5 knee operations to regain full fitness, when ex-teammate Ian Holloway invited Trevor to play for Bristol Rovers and rebuild his career. Trevor won all 3 player of the year awards during the 1998–1999 season.

Trevor scored the winning penalty for Shrewsbury Town when they beat Aldershot Town in the 2004 Conference playoff final. Trevor also helped Weymouth F.C. to the Conference South title in the 2005–2006 season.

In 2010, he started working for Bristol City F.C. and worked as the Academy Recruitment Officer. He is currently under-18s coach.

References

External links

1975 births
Living people
Footballers from Paddington
English footballers
Association football defenders
Queens Park Rangers F.C. players
Bristol Rovers F.C. players
Telford United F.C. players
Shrewsbury Town F.C. players
Weymouth F.C. players
Eastleigh F.C. players
Premier League players
English Football League players
National League (English football) players
Bristol City F.C. non-playing staff